The 46th Assembly District of Wisconsin is one of 99 districts in the Wisconsin State Assembly.  Located in south-central Wisconsin, the district comprises part of central-eastern Dane County, including the city of Sun Prairie, the village of Cottage Grove, and parts of the east side of the city of Madison.  The district is represented by Democrat Melissa Ratcliff, since January 2023.

The 46th Assembly district is located within Wisconsin's 16th Senate district, along with the 47th and 48th Assembly districts.

List of past representatives

References 

Wisconsin State Assembly districts
Dane County, Wisconsin